The Basilian Church of St Peter and Paul and Monastery in Berezwecz was a historic sacred structure in what is today Hlybokaye, Belarus. The church and monastery began with a foundation in 1637 by Joseph Korsak, the voivode of Mścisław. Run by the Order of Saint Basil the Great, the church and monastery were rebuilt in 1750-67 according to a design by Johann Christoph Glaubitz. A widely admired example of Vilnian Baroque the structure's facade was constructed of nine convex and eight concave surfaces.

Berezwecz along with the rest of the Grand Duchy of Lithuania became part of the Russian Empire after the partitions of Poland.

After World War I when Poland regained its independence, the church and monastery were returned to the Catholic Church. After the invasion of Poland in September 1939 started World War II, the area was incorporated into the Soviet Union. The NKVD  the prison set up a prison. Not unlike other areas under Soviet rule in occupied Poland, Berezwecz was the location of a massacre of up to 2,000–3,000 Polish prisoners by the Soviet NKVD secret police. As late as 2009 the remains of more than 20 victims probably shot by NKVD after the takeover of the area from Poland were again discovered.

Berezwecz was annexed into Hlybokaye under Soviet rule. While the monastery building still survives as a prison, the church was destroyed in 1970 on the order of Soviet authorities.

References

The Holocaust in Belarus
Eastern Catholicism in the Polish–Lithuanian Commonwealth
Soviet World War II crimes in Poland
Buildings and structures in the Polish–Lithuanian Commonwealth